Philoganga is a genus of damselflies, the only genus in the family Philogangidae.

Species 
Philoganga loringae 
Philoganga montana 
Philoganga robusta 
Philoganga vetusta  - Ochre Titan

References 

Zygoptera genera
Odonata of Asia
Damselflies
Taxa named by William Forsell Kirby